Aristodemus (c. 550 – c. 490 BC), nicknamed Malakos (meaning "soft" or "malleable" or possibly "effeminate"), was a strategos and then tyrant of Cumae. As a strategos, he twice defeated Etruscan armies. He gained popularity amongst the people of Cumae due to his opposition to the city's aristocracy and his proposals to more fairly share land and to forgive debts. He was then successful in overthrowing the aristocratic faction, yet became a tyrant himself.  He was assassinated by the aristocratic faction around 490 BC.

Life
Born to a distinguished family, Aristodemus was appointed a strategos.  In this role, he defeated the Etruscan armies in 524 BC, and again in 508 BC in the Battle of Aricia.

Having gained the favour of the people, Aristodemus then made himself tyrant of Cumae, and was said to have arranged for many of the nobles to be put to death or sent into exile. He secured his power by surrounding himself with a strong bodyguard and by recruiting mercenaries. Aristodemus had a major influence on the political and social life of the city. He compelled the male descendants of the exiled nobles to be raised in the countryside as if they were slaves; in order to de-politicize the common male youth in the city,

Plutarch agrees that the remaining male youth in the city were forced by law to dress in a feminine manner, and adds that Aristodemus compelled girls "to bob their hair and to wear boy's clothes and the short undergarment."

After the Battle of Lake Regillus (c. 496 BC), the exiled King of Rome, Lucius Tarquinius Superbus took refuge at his court, and died there in 495 BC. Livy records that Aristodemus became Tarquinius' heir, and in 492 BC, when Roman envoys travelled to Cumae to purchase grain, Aristodemus seized the envoys' vessels in response to the Romans' having seized the property of Tarquinius at the time of Tarquinius' exile.

Around 490 BC the exiled nobles and their sons, supported by Campanians and mercenaries, were able to take possession of Cumae, and took cruel vengeance on Aristodemus and his family.

Notes

Ancient Greek tyrants
Magna Graecians
550s BC births
490s BC deaths